Erythrolamprus macrosomus is a species of snake in the family Colubridae. The species is found in Brazil, Argentina, and Paraguay.

References

Erythrolamprus
Reptiles of Brazil
Reptiles of Argentina
Reptiles of Paraguay 
Reptiles described in 1936